The Poet Laureate of Oklahoma is the poet laureate for the U.S. state of Oklahoma.

List of Poets Laureate 
Violet McDougal – 1923–1931
Paul Kroeger – 1931–1940 
Jennie Harris Oliver – 1940–1942 
Della Ione Young –  1943–1944 
Anne Semple – 1944–1945 
Bess Truitt – 1945–1946
Delbert Davis – 1963–1965 
Rudolph N. Hill – 1966–1970
Leslie A. McRill – 1970–1977
Maggie Culver Fry – 1977–1995
Carol Hamilton – 1995–1997
Betty Lou Shipley –  1997–1998 
Joe Kreger – 1998–2001, 2021-2022
Carl Sennhenn – 2001–2003
Francine Ringold – 2003–2007
N. Scott Momaday – 2007–2008
Jim Weaver McKown Barnes – 2009–2010
Eddie Wilcoxen – 2011–2012
Nathan Brown – 2013–2014
Benjamin Myers –  2014–2015
Jeanetta Calhoun Mish – 2017–2018 
Jay Snider - 2023-2024

See also

 Poet laureate
 List of U.S. states' poets laureate
 United States Poet Laureate
 Julie Ann Ward - Poet Laureate of Norman, Oklahoma.

References

External Links

 Oklahoma Poet Laureate at Library of Congress
 Poet Laureate at Oklahoma Arts Council

 
Oklahoma culture
American Poets Laureate